The Hoba meteorite, short for Hoba West, is a meteorite that lies on the farm of the same name, not far from Grootfontein, in the Otjozondjupa Region of Namibia. It has been uncovered, but because of its large mass, has never been moved from where it fell. The main mass is estimated at more than 60 tonnes. It is the largest known intact meteorite (as a single piece) and about twice as massive as the largest fragment of either the Cape York meteorite's 31-tonne Ahnighito kept in Manhattan or the Campo del Cielo's 31-tonne Gancedo in Argentina. It is also the most massive naturally occurring piece of iron (actually ferronickel) known on Earth's surface. The name "Hoba" comes from a Khoekhoegowab word meaning "gift". Following donation to the government in 1987, a visitor centre was constructed with a circular stone access and seating area.

Impact
The Hoba meteorite impact is thought to have occurred less than 80,000 years ago. It is inferred that the Earth's atmosphere slowed the object in such a way that it impacted the surface at terminal velocity, thereby remaining intact and causing little excavation (expulsion of earth). The meteorite is unusual in that it is flat on both major surfaces.

Discovery

The Hoba meteorite left no preserved crater and its discovery was a chance event. In 1920, the owner of the land, Jacobus Hermanus Brits, encountered the object while ploughing one of his fields with an ox. During this work, he heard a loud metallic scratching sound and the plough came to an abrupt halt. The obstruction was excavated, identified as a meteorite and described by Mr. Brits, whose report was published in 1920 and can be viewed at the Grootfontein Museum in Namibia.

Friedrich Wilhelm Kegel took the first published photograph of the Hoba meteorite.

Description and composition

In 1920, its mass was estimated at 66 tonnes. Erosion, scientific sampling and vandalism reduced its bulk over the years. The remaining mass is estimated at just over 64 tonnes. The meteorite is composed of about 84% iron and 16% nickel, with traces of cobalt. It is classified as an ataxite iron meteorite belonging to the nickel-rich chemical class IVB. A crust of iron hydroxides is locally present on the surface due to weathering oxidation.

Modern history
In an attempt to control vandalism, with permission from the farm owner, Mrs O Scheel, on March 15, 1955, the government of South West Africa (now Namibia) declared the Hoba meteorite to be a national monument. Since 1979 the proclamation has been extended to land of 425 m².

From about the 1970s, development of the meteorite site for tourism was hampered by its location in the Otavi triangle of Otavi, Tsumeb and Grootfontein,    a key arena of the Namibian war of independence  or South African Border War. The war and liberation struggle ended with the 1988 Tripartite Accord. General elections under universal franchise, in 1989, led to formation of the independent Republic of Namibia in 1990. 

In 1987, the farm owner donated the meteorite and the site where it lies to the state for educational purposes. Later that year, the government opened a tourist centre at the site. As a result of these developments, vandalism of the Hoba meteorite has ceased and it is now visited by thousands of tourists every year.

Nevertheless, specimens sourced from earlier theft and vandalism continue to be traded. On the 7th of December 2021, an unusually large 2.8 Kg specimen illegally harvested in  1968, was sold for $59062  in Los Angeles, by international auction house Bonhams. The Bonhams sale notice states " the present specimen was obtained in 1968 by the father of the present owner when he visited the main mass of Hoba together with some friends. Using a hand saw, they cut a large block of the meteorite from the main mass "as a souvenir", an activity which took them between three and four hours", .

See also

 Glossary of meteoritics
 List of largest meteorites on Earth

Notes and references

Further reading
Universe: The Definitive Visual Dictionary, Robert Dinwiddie, DK Adult Publishing, (2005), pg. 223.
 
 
 

Meteorites found in Namibia
Otjozondjupa Region
Geography of Namibia
Geology of Namibia
National Monuments of Namibia